Thanh Nguyen may refer to:
 Tan Duc Thanh Nguyen, Vietnamese–Australian citizen convicted in Indonesia for drug trafficking
 Thanh Nguyen (weightlifter), American weightlifter
 Viet Thanh Nguyen, Vietnamese-American novelist